"A New Day Has Come" is a song by Canadian recording artist Celine Dion for her seventh English-language album of the same name (2002). The song was written by Aldo Nova and Stephan Moccio and produced by Walter Afanasieff and Nova. It was released as the album's lead single on 11 March 2002. "A New Day Has Come" is a piano-driven ballad in  time. However, the midtempo radio version, co-produced and remixed by Christian B & Marc Dold of (S.A.F.) along with Ric Wake, converted the song into  time, added guitars and other electronic elements and was released as the lead single. Both versions are included on the album.

Dion revealed that the song represents the birth of her child. It received positive reviews from music critics, who complimented Dion's vocals and its uplifting lyrics. The music video was directed by Dave Meyers and premiered in March 2002. The song was a success around the world, reaching top ten on the Canadian Singles Chart, UK Singles Chart and many European charts; while reaching number 22 on the Billboard Hot 100 and topping for 21 weeks the Hot Adult Contemporary Tracks chart. The song was later included on compilations My Love: Essential Collection, Complete Best, Ultimate Box in 2008 as well as The Best So Far... 2018 Tour Edition in 2018.

Background 
In 2000, Dion announced that she was taking a break from her career. During the time away, she focused on her personal life and gave birth to her first child. After two years, Dion announced her return and admitted she was eager to get back into the studio: 

The single is her first in English since 2000's "I Want You to Need Me". "A New Day Has Come" was released on 6 February 2002 to radio stations in the US. It was released on 11 March 2002 internationally. In October 2008, "A New Day Has Come" was included on the compilation My Love: Essential Collection.

Composition  

"A New Day Has Come" was written by Aldo Nova and Stephan Moccio and produced by Walter Afanasieff, Nova  and Ric Wake (the latter only produced the "radio edit"). The song also features additional production from Richie Jones, Christian B, and Marc Dold. The song has two versions: the piano-driven ballad in  time and the midtempo radio version in common time. Both versions are available on the album.  Both versions of the song are written in the key of F major.  The original version of the song features a slow tempo of 40 beats per minute, while the radio remix features one of 92 beats per minute.

Lyrically, the song is about the world thinking that she has it all, but she draws us in to the sadness she must have experienced with life issues, such as her older husband being ill and knowing that she had problems conceiving a baby. Her then 13-month-old son Rene-Charles Dion Angelil is the main subject of the love song, with Dion singing: "Where there was weakness I've found my strength/All in the eyes of a boy."

According to Dion, the song is about her son:

Critical reception 
"A New Day Has Come" garnered mostly stellar reviews from music critics. Stephen Thomas Erlewine of AllMusic highlighted the song. Barnes & Noble's Editorial review wrote that "It marks Celine Dion's return to recording after a lengthy maternity leave, and charts the pop diva's growth as an artist and as a woman. Although Dion's songs have always been about the power of love she wasn't mincing words when she titled her 1997 blockbuster Let's Talk About Love, maternal rather than romantic sentiment fuels her fire this time out. As she gushes on the uplifting title song." Chuck Taylor from Billboard wrote that the life-affirming "A New Day Has Come" "comes off like a gentle exhale against the world's ills." The Ric Wake Radio Remix of "A New Day Has Come" opens with an "Enya-inspired whisper before a shuffle skips in and lifts the song upward like a dove gracefully taking flight." The Album Edit "comes sans the beat, allowing Dion's performance alone to fully color the message." According to him, on both versions Dion "embraces a particularly restrained performance – dramatic enough to steer the track's emotion, but still delicate to offer comfort. Dave Karger of Entertainment Weekly wrote that "Though celebratory in tone, the track features surprisingly restrained vocals from Dion (so as not to wake the baby?). Lyrically subtle, no, but as lullabies go, it's not bad." Sal Cinquemani of Slant Magazine wrote that "one of the album's standout tracks are the uplifting midtempo number "I'm Alive" and the stirring title track (not since 1993's "The Power of Love" has a Dion performance been so restrained)."

Commercial performance 
On the Austrian Singles Chart, the song debuted at number 10, on 24 March 2002. The following week, the song fell to number 14. However, on 7 April 2002, the song moved again to number 10. The following week, the song peaked at number 9, where it remained for another week. "A New Day Has Come" kept fluctuating on the chart for the next two weeks, until it reached number 9, once again. It stayed on the charts for 15 consecutive weeks. In Sweden, the song was a success, debuting and peaking at number 3 on the Swedish Singles Chart, on 22 March 2002. The song spent 12 weeks on the Swedish charts. On the Norwegian Singles Chart, the song debuted at number seven. It peaked at number 3 for two consecutive weeks and spent 10 weeks on the chart. The single was also successful on the Danish Singles Chart, debuting and peaking at number 3 and spending 8 consecutive weeks on the chart. The single was also certified gold in Greece (30,000) and Norway (10,000). In Poland, the song went number 1 for seven weeks on the Polish Singles Chart, becoming the biggest international hit of 2002 in that country.

On the Australian ARIA Singles Chart, the song debuted at number 23. The following week, it climbed to number 21, while in its third week, the song fell to number 25. However, the song climbed from number 25 to number 20, the following week. In its fifth week, the song fell again and dropped to number 29, but in its sixth week, the song climbed to number 19, becoming its peak position. The song spent 12 consecutive weeks on the ARIA charts and was certified Gold by the Australian Recording Industry Association (ARIA) for selling more than 35,000 units of the song. On the New Zealand Singles Chart, the song debuted at number 39, where it remained for the second week. It later climbed to number 34, but fell to number 35, where it stayed for another week. However, the following weeks, the song keep on climbing to numbers 29, 24, 21 and finally reaching number 20, its peak position. It spent 16 weeks on the chart.

On the U.S. Hot Adult Contemporary Tracks, the song broke the record for most weeks at number 1: it stayed on top for twenty-one weeks. The previous record holders were Phil Collins' "You'll Be in My Heart" and Céline Dion's own "Because You Loved Me," both of which lasted nineteen weeks at number 1. However, the record has been surpassed, as "Drift Away" by Uncle Kracker featuring Dobie Gray remained twenty-eight weeks at number 1 in 2004. Ironically, it was Céline Dion who almost took the crown from "Drift Away," but "Have You Ever Been in Love" stopped at number 2 for fourteen weeks, which is another record. In the U.S. Billboard Hot 100, the song reached number 22, becoming her last successful single on the Hot 100 chart. The DVD single was released four months later in the U.S., peaking at number 11 on the Top Music Video and number 16 on the Hot 100 Singles Sales. It has sold 45,000 copies and was certified gold.
 
In the United Kingdom, the song entered the UK Singles Chart at number 7, on 23 March 2002. It later, fell to numbers 13, 15, 20, 24 and 29, until it climbed to number 27, on 5 April 2002. It dropped the UK Singles Chart at number 64, on 25 May 2002, spending 10 weeks on the chart. It was certified Silver in 2018. In Ireland, the song debuted at number 10 on the Irish Singles Chart, for the week ending 14 March 2002. The following week, it fell to number 11 but in its third week, it moved again to number 10. The song spent 10 consecutive weeks on the Irish charts.

Awards 
"A New Day Has Come" won ASCAP Pop Award and BMI Pop Award for Most Performed Song, and three SOCAN Awards in categories: Pop Music, International Achievement and Classic Songs. The song was also nominated for the Juno Award for Single of the Year and the Billboard Music Award for Hot Adult Contemporary Track. The music video was nominated for MuchMoreMusic Award as well.

Music video 
The music video was directed by Dave Meyers and premiered in March 2002. It was shot on West Palm Beach, United States. The video features people from the different cultures living through a day interspersed with Dion singing among the clouds and later on a beach.

Live performances and promotion  
"A New Day Has Come" was performed and included on the VH1 Divas 2002 album. Dion heavily promoted the song in 2002 singing it during various TV programmes and specials such as Wetten, dass..? in Germany on 23 March 2002 or on the "Rockin' For the USA" show, on 25 May 2002. Dion performed the ballad version of the song during her show A New Day... at Caesars Palace, Las Vegas since November 2004 and released it on the Live in Las Vegas - A New Day... DVD in December 2007. The ballad version was also performed on Oprah Winfrey show in 2007 as part of promotion of Taking Chances. The Radio Remix was performed only once in Seoul, South Korea during Taking Chances World Tour on 18 March 2008. Later on "A New Day Has Come" was not performed until 2015 when Dion came back with her revamped residency show in Vegas called Celine and included a shortened acoustic version of the song. A new shortened string version of the song premiered during her 2018 tour, which replaced the first acoustic version of the song in the final year of her Las Vegas residency show.

Formats and track listings 

European CD single
"A New Day Has Come" (Radio Version) – 4:23
"A New Day Has Come" (Album Edit) – 4:18

European/Australian CD maxi-single
"A New Day Has Come" (Radio Version) – 4:23
"A New Day Has Come" (Album Edit) – 4:18
"Prayer" – 5:34
"A New Day Has Come" (Christian B. Mix) – 3:59

Japanese CD single
"A New Day Has Come" (Radio Version) – 4:23
"Prayer" – 5:34

UK cassette and CD single
"A New Day Has Come" (Radio Version) – 4:23
"A New Day Has Come" (Album Edit) – 4:18
"Prayer" – 5:34

UK CD single #2
"A New Day Has Come" (Album Edit) – 4:18
"Sous le vent" – 3:30
"Misled" – 3:30
"Misled" (Video) – 3:30

US DVD single
"A New Day Has Come" Video – 4:20
Making the "A New Day Has Come" Video – 3:03
Making the Album – 12:15
"Have You Ever Been in Love" in the Studio – 5:05
Biography
Photo Gallery

Credits and personnel
Credits are adapted from the liner notes of A New Day Has Come, Epic Records.

Recording locations
 Recording -  Cove City Sound Studios (Long Island, New York)
 Sony Music Studios (New York)
 Wallyworld (California)
 The Enterprise II (Los Angeles)
 Studio Piccolo (Montreal, Quebec)
 Maison de Musique (Sony Oasis, Canada)

Personnel
 Songwriting –   Aldo Nova and Stephan Moccio
 Production –  Walter Afanasieff, Aldo Nova and Ric Wake
 Additional Production - Richie Jones, Christian B, Marc Dold
 Guitars - Chieli Minucci, Marc Dold
 Mixing - Mick Guzauski

Charts

Weekly charts

Year-end charts

Decade-end charts

Certifications and sales

Release history

See also 
 Billboard Year-End Hot 100 singles of 2002
 List of number-one adult contemporary singles of 2002 (U.S.)
 List of UK top 10 singles in 2002

References

External links 
 

Celine Dion songs
2002 singles
Columbia Records singles
Epic Records singles
Number-one singles in the Czech Republic
Number-one singles in Poland
Pop ballads
Songs containing the I–V-vi-IV progression
Songs written by Aldo Nova
Songs written by Stephan Moccio
Song recordings produced by Ric Wake
Song recordings produced by Walter Afanasieff
Music videos directed by Dave Meyers (director)
2002 songs
2000s ballads